Ganyra josephina, the giant white, is a butterfly in the family Pieridae. It is found from southern Texas through Mexico and Central America to northern South America. The habitat consists of open, dry, subtropical forests.

The cell of the upper forewing of the male contains a prominent round black spot. The wet-season form of the female has a black cell spot and also some diffuse black postmedian spots. The veins are outlined with black near the wing margins. The dry-season form of the female is not so prominently marked. Adults are on wing from September to December in southern Texas. They feed on flower nectar from a variety of weeds and garden plants including Lantana, Eupatorium and Bougainvillea.

The larvae feed on older leaves of Capparidaceae species.

Subspecies
The following subspecies are recognized:
G. j. josephina
G. j. josepha (Salvin & Godman, 1868) (southern Texas, Mexico, Guatemala, Honduras, Nicaragua)
G. j. krugii (Dewitz, 1877) (Puerto Rico)
G. j. menciae (Ramsden, [1914]) (Cuba)
G. j. janeta (Dixey, 1915) (Venezuela)
G. j. paramaryllis (Comstock, 1943) (Jamaica)

References

Pierini
Butterflies described in 1819
Pieridae of South America
Butterflies of Central America
Butterflies of North America
Taxa named by Jean-Baptiste Godart